José Guedes Brandão de Melo (30 October 1846 – 23 September 1919) was a Portuguese colonial administrator and a military officer. He was a son of Francisco Brandão de Melo Cogominho and Maria da Natividade Guedes de Carvalho e Meneses, who was a sister of José and Vasco Guedes de Carvalho e Meneses. On 10 May 1876, he married Maria dos Prazeres Mimoso da Costa Pereira Alpoim de Carvalho (born 3 March 1859). He was governor general of Cape Verde from 4 February 1890 until 5 September 1893.

See also
List of colonial governors of Cape Verde

References

1846 births
1919 deaths
People from Porto
Colonial heads of Cape Verde
Portuguese colonial governors and administrators
Portuguese generals